Downset may refer to:
Downset lattice
Down set
Downset., an American rap metal band
downset., the 1994 self-titled debut studio album
"Downset", the title track of the self-titled 1994 album by downset.